= San Giorgio, Campobasso =

Church in Campobasso, Italy

Coordinates: 41.5626°N 14.6571°E

San Giorgio is an ancient, Romanesque architecture style, Roman Catholic church in the hill-town of Campobasso, in the province of the same name, Region of Molise, Italy.

== History ==
The church of San Giorgio was apparently constructed atop a pagan temple; it is one of oldest churches in Campobasso. The entrance portal has carved Romanesque decoration. The walls contain spolia from prior structures. The rectangular bell tower stands aside the church. The entrance to the Chapel of St Gregory is from the presbytery, and it has an octagonal dome above. The walls were frescoed in the 15th century, and depict St Augustine and the Saints. In the right aisle of the Nave is the tomb of Delicata Civerra.
